J. William Whedbee (September 24, 1938January 22, 2004) was an American Biblical historian. He was the Nancy J. Lyon Professor of Biblical History and Literature at Pomona College in Claremont, California, where he taught for 37 years.

Early life and education 
Whedbee was born on September 24, 1938. He attended [[Westmont College</2>]], Fuller Theological Seminary, and Yale University.

Works

Recognition 
Whedbee won Pomona's Wig Award, the college's highest honor for teaching, five times.

References 

1938 births
2004 deaths
American biblical scholars
Pomona College faculty
Place of birth missing
Place of death missing
Alumni of Westcott House, Cambridge
Fuller Theological Seminary alumni
Yale University alumni